The Ogunpa River river system is a third-order stream with a channel length of  and a drainage basin covering  draining the densely populated eastern part of Ibadan, Nigeria. The city of Ibadan in southwestern Nigeria (7º23’ N, 3º5’ E) is the largest urban centre in Africa south of the Sahara. Ogunpa River is known to contain 49 species of zooplankton.

Public safety
Household waste is known to be dumped along the path of the Ogunpa. This sometimes results in disastrous consequences.

In 1960, more than 1,000 residents were rendered homeless when the Ogunpa River exceeded its banks. More than 500 houses were damaged in 1963 when the river again flooded the city. In 1978, official record confirmed that 32 bodies were retrieved from the ruins of the flood and more than 100 houses were destroyed.

Disaster

It was, however, the flood of August 31, 1980 that gave the Ogunpa national and international notoriety. After about 10 hours of heavy downpour recorded as four times heavier than it was during the 1978 flood, the city of Ibadan was virtually left in ruins. More than 100 bodies were retrieved from the debris of collapsed houses and vehicles washed away by the deluge.  Over 200 people died and over 50,000 were left homeless.

Channelisation project

In 1999, the Nigerian Government took over the "Channelisation Project" of the Ogunpa River. They had been bedeviled by series of problems since 1977. It was first started by the state government of Oyo State. To this end, a 10 billion naira contract was awarded to finish the channelisation of the Ogunpa.

Although the project was scheduled for completion in February 2003, some of the contractors working on the channelisation reportedly abandoned the site unfinished.

References

Rivers of Nigeria
Rivers of Yorubaland